David Lee Coleman (born October 26, 1950) is a former outfielder in Major League Baseball who played briefly for the Boston Red Sox during the  season. He batted and threw right-handed.

Coleman attended Stebbins High School in Riverside, a suburb of Dayton.

Listed at 6-3, 195 lb., Coleman played in just eleven major league games. In those games, he scored one run and went hitless in twelve at-bats.

In 1979, Coleman was traded by Boston to the Minnesota Twins for Larry Wolfe, but he never appeared in a major league game again. From 1979 through 1981, he played in the minor leagues on affiliates of the Twins and the New York Yankees, retiring from baseball after the 1981 season.

Notes

External links
, or Retrosheet, or Pura Pelota (Venezuelan Winter League)

1950 births
Living people
Baseball players from Dayton, Ohio
Boston Red Sox players
Bristol Red Sox players
Columbus Clippers players
Major League Baseball outfielders
Navegantes del Magallanes players
American expatriate baseball players in Venezuela
Pawtucket Red Sox players
Rhode Island Red Sox players
Toledo Mud Hens players
Winston-Salem Red Sox players
Winter Haven Red Sox players